In the 1950–51 season, USM Marengo is competing in the First Division for the 2nd season French colonial era, as well as the Forconi Cup. They competing in Division Honneur, and the Forconi Cup.

Competitions

Overview

First Division

League table

Group I

Results by round

Matches

Forconi Cup

Squad information

Playing statistics

Goalscorers
Includes all competitive matches. The list is sorted alphabetically by surname when total goals are equal.

Notes

References

External links
 L'Echo d'Alger : journal républicain du matin
 La Dépêche quotidienne : journal républicain du matin
 Alger républicain : journal républicain du matin

USMM Hadjout seasons
Algerian football clubs 1950–51 season